This is a discography of Iphigénie en Tauride, an opera  by Christoph Willibald Gluck, first performed at the Paris Opéra on May 18, 1779.

Audio

Video

References

Sources
Operadis discography, accessed 16 May 2011
 ODE - Opera Discography Encyclopaedia by Carlo Marinelli, accessed 16 May 2011

Opera discographies
Iphigenia